WOCN-FM (104.7 FM, "Ocean 104.7") is a soft adult contemporary radio station licensed to Orleans, Massachusetts. The station is licensed to Sandab Communications (doing business as Cape Cod Broadcasting) and operated locally.  WOCN-FM is a sister station to WQRC, WFCC-FM, and WKPE-FM.

WOCN-FM is frequently one of the Cape's most-listened-to radio stations, especially among adults 45 and older.

Artists that are played on WOCN-FM include the Beatles, Carly Simon, James Taylor, Norah Jones, Fleetwood Mac and others.  WOCN-FM continues to serve the Cape Cod community with hourly weather forecasts, news updates and community information. Although previously playing more soft AC, it has shifted to play more current artists (e.g. Mariah Carey, Sara Bareilles, The Band Perry, Sheryl Crow, Cher).

History
The station went on the air on July 25, 1974, as WVLC-FM, broadcasting at 104.7 MHz. Initially, the station was just a full-time simulcast of WVLC (1170 AM, now WFPB). WVLC-FM became WLOM in 1977.

In 1980, the FM band was still new territory for Top-40 radio.  Boston's Kiss 108 had only started one year prior and was very popular, routinely beating Top 40 AM station WRKO in the ratings.  Cape Cod needed its own similar station to compete in its own market, and in May 1980, 104.7 changed its call letters to WKZE-FM and began its own programming, branding itself "KZ 104 FM".

After just over 3 successful years in the Top 40/CHR format, the station rebranded itself as "Cape 104" on August 1, 1983; a few months later, the call letters were changed to WKPE. Under the management of Roth Media and legendary Program Director Jack Alix  "Cape 104" would become one of the Cape's most iconic stations. WKPE enjoyed ratings success throughout the 1980s.  Legendary voices on the station included Jonny St. John (best known as the voice of Duke Nukem), Alan "Al" Matthews, Tommy Casey, Captain Cape, Dave Sharp, Clarence Barnes, Pilot Gene, James "Jammin' Jamie" West, Steve Binder, Danny Walsh, Mac Dickson, Christine Fox, Paul Attea, Keith Lemire, Joe Rossetti, J.R. Randall, Marty Moran, Carolyn Johnson, Danny Walsh, Donna Wilde, Kristie Wiemer, Ricky Ryder, Tony Vincent, Rick Pendelton, R.J. McKay, Steve McVie, Jamie "J.D." Bearse, Liza Z., Danny Savage, Danny C., Krissy Krantz, John Stevens, and David Wolf just to name a few.  After the Top 40 format fragmented, "Cape 104" switched formats in the fall of 1992, rebranding itself "Oldies 104" to compete with Boston's "Oldies 103" and Nantucket's "Oldies 96" (which went Top-40 in January 1993).

After a 2½-year experiment in the Oldies format, during the spring of 1995, WKPE switched formats to a modern rock format and became "Rock 104.7, The Cape."  It was in direct competition with WPXC. In 1999, the station was sold by Grancam Communications to Charles River Broadcasting.  In September 1999, the station switched formats to classic rock.

With the 2006-07 dismantling of Charles River Broadcasting, Cape Cod Broadcasting, owner of WQRC and WOCN-FM, signed a contract to operate WFCC-FM and WKPE under a local marketing agreement, with the two stations still licensed to Charles River.

Upon the acquisition of Charles River Broadcasting's Cape Cod assets, it was announced that the popular "Ocean 104" would relocate to the stronger Class B signal of 104.7 MHz, swapping frequencies with WKPE-FM. The swap occurred on April 17, 2007.

External links

 The Ocean to switch frequency

OCN
Soft adult contemporary radio stations in the United States
Orleans, Massachusetts
Radio stations established in 1974